The Overseas Ministry (in Portuguese: Ministério do Ultramar) was the department of the Government of Portugal responsible for the administration of the overseas provinces.

In relation to the Portuguese Overseas territories, the Overseas Ministry had jurisdiction over almost all matters of government that, in the European Portugal, was divided by various ministries, including revenue and customs, economical affairs, internal security, public works, transports and communications, justice, civil administration, education and public health. The ministry also had responsibilities in the external relations with neighboring areas of the Portuguese overseas territories and in the military affairs. The Overseas Minister superintended all governors-general and governors of the Portuguese Overseas.

The ministry had its origins in the Overseas and Navy Ministry (Ministério da Marinha e do Ultramar), established in 1736, by King John V of Portugal. In 1911, the colonial affairs were separated from the Navy Ministry, being created an autonomous Colonies Ministry. In 1951, the department was renamed "Overseas Ministry".

After the Carnation Revolution on 25 April 1974, the ministry continued to exist, provisionally, as the Interterritorial Coordination Ministry, until the independence of the last Portuguese territories of Africa in 1975. From 1975, until its ultimate extinction in 1976, the structure of the ministry continued to function, first as the Secretariat of State for the Decolonization (Secretaria de Estado da Descolonização) and then as the Cooperation Ministry (Ministério da Cooperação).

See also
 , 1911–1976
 Arquivo Histórico Ultramarino, archives administered by the ministry 1931–1973
 Gabinete de Urbanização Colonial, urban planning office, 1944–1974
 

Overseas
Portuguese Empire
Portugal, Overseas
Portugal
Defunct organisations based in Portugal